Ján Hözl (born 13 February 1984 in Skýcov) is a Slovak football midfielder.

References

External links
FK DAC 1904 profile 
FC ViOn profile 

1984 births
Living people
Slovak footballers
Association football midfielders
FC ViOn Zlaté Moravce players
Slovak Super Liga players
MŠK Novohrad Lučenec players
FC DAC 1904 Dunajská Streda players
MFK Topvar Topoľčany players
People from Nitra District
Sportspeople from the Nitra Region